Andrea Proske (born June 27, 1986) is a Canadian rower.

Career
In 2018 and 2019, Proske competed with Gabrielle Smith in the double sculls boat at the World Rowing Championships. In 2018, they finished in sixth and in 2019 fourth, and qualifying Canada the boat for the 2020 Summer Olympics.

In June 2021, Proske was named to Canada's 2020 Olympic team in the women's eights boat. At the Olympics, the boat won the gold medal, Canada's first in the event since 1992.

References

External Links 

 Official website

1986 births
Canadian female rowers
Living people
Rowers from Vancouver
Rowers at the 2020 Summer Olympics
Medalists at the 2020 Summer Olympics
Olympic medalists in rowing
Olympic gold medalists for Canada
21st-century Canadian women